Antonio Maria Blanco (15 September 1912 – 10 December 1999) was a painter of Spanish and American descent.

Biography
Antonio Maria Blanco was born in the Ermita district of Manila, Philippines. He initially lived and worked in Florida and California in the United States, until he became interested in exploring the islands of the Pacific Ocean that had been a source of inspiration for painters such as Paul Gauguin, José Miguel Covarrubias and others before him. He planned to go to Tahiti, but fate brought him to Hawaii, Japan and Cambodia, where he was a guest of honor of Prince Norodom Sihanouk. From Cambodia he went to Bali in 1952 and married a traditional Balinese dancer named Ni Ronji in 1953. Bali gave Blanco important elements that he needed to develop his artistic gifts: the beautiful scenery, the dreamlike atmosphere of the environment and the pervasive art and great love.

Settled in Bali, Blanco began to realize his dreams in life and work. He built a house and museum in Ubud which contains many of his paintings.

The land on which the construction was erected was given to Blanco by the King of Ubud Tjokorda Gde Agung Sukawati. Women are the focal point of his paintings and one could say that Blanco was a painter of the eternal feminine and his style is romantic-expressive and dreamy.

Blanco received numerous awards, including the Tiffany Fellowship (special award from The Society of Honolulu Artists), Chevalier du Sahametrai of Cambodia, the Society of Painters of Fine Art Quality of President Sukarno and the Prize of the Art Critique in Spain. Blanco was also awarded the order of Cruz de Caballero from the King of Spain Juan Carlos I, giving him the title of "Don" in front of his name.

Many collectors have appreciated his paintings, including the actress Ingrid Bergman, Mexican telenovela queen Thalia (Ariadna Thalia Sodi Miranda), Sukarno (the first President of Indonesia), Suharto (the second president of Indonesia), the former Indonesian Vice President Adam Malik, Prince Norodom Sihanouk, Michael Jackson and many more.
 
The Blanco Renaissance Museum, Blanco's lifetime dream, was opened on December 28, 1998 at his residence in a beautiful environment, where more than 300 works of Blanco are exposed in chronological order to show his artistic development. The sumptuous and impressive building offers a glimpse of the theatrical character of the artist. He emulated the flamboyance of Dali, to whom he has been compared.

Don Antonio Maria Blanco died on December 10, 1999 in Denpasar, Bali, from heart and kidney disease, survived by his wife and four children: Cempaka, Mario, Orchid and Mahadewi. Since Blanco converted to Hinduism, he had a cremation ceremony Balinese style in Ubud, finished on 28 December 1999.

Gallery 
His house on a hill in Ubud is now a museum devoted to him.

References

External links 
 Don Antonio Blanco - In Memoriam
 The Antonio Blanco museum official web site
 
  (Russian)
 Documentary about Bali art and Antonio Blanco influence 

1912 births
1999 deaths
Indonesian painters
People from Ermita
Indo people
Converts to Hinduism
Indonesian former Christians
Indonesian Hindus
Indonesian people of American descent
Indonesian people of Spanish descent
Filipino emigrants to Indonesia
Deaths from kidney disease
Filipino expatriates in the United States